Alejandro Davidovich Fokina was the defending champion, but participated at the men's singles qualifying as a wild card, who lost to Peter Polansky in the second round.

Tseng Chun-hsin won the title, defeating Jack Draper in the final, 6–1, 6–7(2–7), 6–4.

Seeds

Draw

Finals

Top half

Section 1

Section 2

Bottom half

Section 3

Section 4

Qualifying

Seeds

Qualifiers

Lucky loser

Draw

First qualifier

Second qualifier

Third qualifier

Fourth qualifier

Fifth qualifier

Sixth qualifier

Seventh qualifier

Eighth qualifier

External links
 Draw

Boys' Singles
Wimbledon Championship by year – Boys' singles